Niggli Nunataks is a group of nunataks 6 nautical miles (11 km) north-northeast of Mount Wegener, rising to 1,470 m near the east end of the Read Mountains, Shackleton Range. Photographed from the air by the U.S. Navy, 1967. Surveyed by British Antarctic Survey (BAS), 1968–71. In association with the names of geologists grouped in this area, named by the United Kingdom Antarctic Place-Names Committee (UK-APC) in 1971 after Paul Niggli (1888–1953), Swiss geologist who introduced the cataloguing of magma types by molecular or Niggli values; Professor of Geology, University of Zurich.

Nunataks of Coats Land